Lesbian, gay, bisexual, and transgender (LGBT) persons in Macau, which is a special administrative region of China, face legal challenges not experienced by non-LGBT residents. While same-sex sexual activity was decriminalized in 1996, same-sex couples and households headed by same-sex couples remain ineligible for some legal rights available to opposite-sex couples.

Law regarding same-sex sexual activity
Same-sex sexual activity became legal in 1996. The general age of consent for homosexual sex, as well as heterosexual, is 14 years.

According to "Penal Code of Macau" Article 166, committing anal coitus with whomever under the age of 14 is a crime and shall be punished by imprisonment between 3 and up 10 years. If anal coitus is committed with someone 14 to 16 years old, taking advantage of his/her inexperience, is a crime punished with a prison term up to 4 years.

Recognition of same-sex relationships

Same-sex marriage or civil unions are not currently recognised in Macau.

In March 2013, José Pereira Coutinho, a Member of the Legislative Assembly, submitted a bill to the Legislative Assembly to recognize same-sex civil unions, granting them the same rights as heterosexual couples, except the right to adopt. The bill was rejected with the sole vote of Coutinho in favor, 17 votes against and 4 abstentions

Discrimination protection
The Basic Law of Macau's Article 25 indicates the people of Macau are free from discrimination based on a non-exhaustive list of prohibited factors. Sexual orientation is not included in said list of prohibited discrimination grounds. However, there are anti-discrimination protections based on sexual orientation in the fields of labour relations (article 6/2 of the  Law No. 7/2008), protection of personal data (article 7/1,2 of Law No. 8/2005), and ombudsman (article 31-A of Law No. 4/2012).

The Principle of equality in the Labour Relations Law protects workers and job seekers from discrimination on the ground of sexual orientation.  Employers who contravene the principle may be find up to MOP$50,000 for every worker or job seeker affected.

Domestic violence law

In 2011, the Macau government conducted a public consultation on a draft law against domestic violence in which "same-sex cohabitants in an intimate relationship" were in the scope of protection.  However, in the concluding report published in 2012, the Macau government decided to drop the reference to same-sex cohabitants for "a lack of social consensus".

In October 2015, Rainbow of Macau submitted a complaint to the UN Committee against Torture alleging the Macau government of "depriving persons in same-sex Relationship of equal protection in domestic violence legislation".  The Committee, in its concluding observations on Macau, noted its concern that not "all individuals in an intimate relationship regardless of their sexual orientation" were in the scope of the draft domestic violence law.  The Committee urged the Macau government to protect all victims of domestic violence "without discrimination".

In 2016, the Macau government insisted on the exclusion of same-sex cohabitants from the scope of the domestic violence legislation. Rainbow of Macau criticised the Macau government for enacting "a discriminatory law" and expressed its concern about "[sending] a harmful message to Macau communities that discrimination on the ground of sexual orientation is justifiable".

Gender identity

In February 2015, transgender women Avery (pseudonym) talked to the Macau media about the experience of abuse and bullying when she was studying in a local school.  Avery requested the Macau authorities to change the gender marker on her identity documents.  In June 2015, the Law Reform Consultative Committee announced the commencement of a study on revising the law to allow transgender people to apply for changing gender marker.

In 2020, the UN Human Rights Committee asked the Macau government to provide information on any step taken to "legally recognize transgender persons" and enable them to change the gender marker on identity documents.

Homophobia

Stigmatisation

On 9 June 2015, local newspaper Exmoo published a story on the front page about a high school student allegedly molesting a 9-year-old child.  The perpetrator was referred to as "gay demon" in the title of the story.  Spokesperson for Rainbow of Macau Jason Chao, in an article published in the Macau Concealers, criticised the use of the term "demon".  Chao said the Penal Code of Macau treats homosexual and heterosexual sex offenders in the same way.  The abuse of power relations, rather than homosexuality, would constitute an aggravation in this criminal case.   Chao added that the newspaper's logic would justify the saying that "straight demons" were invading Macau "en masse" since the perpetrators in Macau's sex abuse cases had been predominately heterosexual.

Clinical examination

On 16 August 2018, deputy director of the Education and Youth Affairs Bureau (DSEJ) Leong Vai Kei said that students with "indications of homosexuality" would be referred to doctors or psychologists for a medical examination.  Later, Leong claimed that the media had misquoted her and apologised for the incorrect translation from Cantonese.

LGBT rights activism and culture
In late 2012 it was announced the creation of the "Macau LGBT Rights Concern Group", led by openly gay politician Jason Chao. Since the creation of the Concern Group it has had an active presence in local media advocating for LGBT rights, namely the inclusion of gay couples in the domestic violence bill and the recognition of same-sex marriage or civil unions.
In April 2013 was created the association "Rainbow of Macau", a new group striving to protect the rights of Macau's LGBT community. The Rainbow of Macau is the city's first gay rights group officially registered and is led by Anthony Lam Ka Long.

Despite the surge in LGBT activism, gay culture in Macau remains mostly invisible. However, the lesbian-themed movie I'm here, directed by Tracy Choi, won the Macau Indies 2012 Jury's Award at the Macau International Film and Video Festival 2012 (MIFVF). According to the newspaper Macau Daily Times, "the movie depicts the problems that homosexuals face in their daily life, especially when living in a small town" like Macau.

Summary table

See also
Human rights in Macau
 LGBT rights in China
 LGBT rights in Hong Kong
 LGBT rights in Asia

Notes

References

Macau law
Human rights in Macau
LGBT rights in the People's Republic of China